Dhan Dhana Dhan Goal is a 2007 Indian Hindi-language sports drama film produced by Ronnie Screwvala and directed by Vivek Agnihotri for UTV Motion Pictures. The film stars John Abraham, Bipasha Basu, Arshad Warsi and Boman Irani. The film's soundtrack is composed by Pritam with lyrics by Javed Akhtar. Dhan Dhana Dhan Goal is a contemporary fictional story of the South Asian community in the UK, told through the prism of professional football. Upon its release on 23 November 2007, the film received negative reviews and was only moderately successful at the box-office and was declared "Average" by Box Office India. The film was premiered in the Tous Les Cinemas du Monde (World Cinema) section of 2007 Cannes Film Festival.

Plot
Jaidev and Kavita Bhasin live a middle-classed lifestyle in Southall, England, with their son, Sunny.

During the mid-80s Jaidev was a huge fan of the all-Asian Southall Football Club, and their team was very successful so much so that it generated hatred from opposing mainstream Caucasian teams, who attacked Jaidev and the team's star player, Tony Singh.

This spelled the end of the team, and the ground was then rented out for weddings and birthday parties. Jaidev wanted Sunny to play for Southall, but Sunny believed himself to be British and joined the Aston Football Club.

When the time comes for selection, Sunny, often referred to as 'Paki', is sidelined. Embittered, he joins the Southall Club, and he, and the Captain Shaan Ali Khan, as well as Coach Tony Singh, steer the team to many victories including a place in the semi-finals.

However, just before Southall team intends to play against Gatwick, they get the news that Sunny has switched to another more prestigious club in exchange for a fancy sports car, a four bedroom mansion, a handsome signing amount, and a generous weekly allowance.

This leaves Southall to turn its ground over to the Chair of the City Council who wants to demolish it, and build a shopping mall and theme park in its place. His actions prompt the community to ostracise him for his betrayal and treat him with contempt and disdain.

However, Sunny eventually discovers the truth of his father's attack and support for Southall. Deeply moved he rejects his contract and heads back to help Southall win the Final match against Aston and redeems himself to his teammates and community.

Cast 
John Abraham as Sunny Bhasin
Bipasha Basu as Dr. Rumana
Arshad Warsi as Shaan Ali Khan
Shernaz Patel as Shweta
Kushal Punjabi as Ranveer "Goalie"
Boman Irani as Tony Singh
Dalip Tahil as Johny Bakshi
Rajendranath Zutshi as Monty Singh
Dibyendu Bhattacharya as Debashish "Debu"
 Saurabh Dubey as Jaidev Bhasin, Sunny's father 
Judan Ali as himself
Towsif Jahan as Semi-Professional Footballer 
Sana Khan as item number for song Billo Rani
 Ajay Kalyansingh as Southall United Football Fan

Production
The film had the working title of Goal until August 2007.

Locations
While the film was being shot at Millwall FC’s stadium The Den, Abhishek Bachchan and Aishwarya Rai made a surprise appearance to watch the filming of Dhan Dhana Dhan Goal.

Old Trafford is also shown during a scene where Tony tries to inspire the players to play for more than just themselves by telling them the story of the Munich Air Disaster, and how Manchester United fought against the odds; the cast also got to shoot inside the dressing room.

Soundtrack 

The soundtrack for the film was released in August 2007. It has been given a rating of 3 out of 5 on indiaFm.com.

Lyrics by Javed Akhtar. Background score by Sanjoy Chowdhury, the son of late Maestro Sri Salil Chowdhury.

Critical reception
Taran Adarsh of Indiafm.com gave the film 3 out of 5, saying "On the whole, Dhan Dhana Dhan Goal has an ordinary first hour, but the post-interval portions, especially the exhilarating climax, makes up for everything."

Conversely, Raja Sen of  Rediff.com gave the film 1 star out of 5, writing ″this film is a complete and utter drag, and a case in point against thoughtless derivative sports films, a trend threatening to grow following the success of fine films like Chak De! India and Iqbal.″ Gautam Bhaskaran of The Hollywood Reporter wrote ″the script is full of cliched. Must we continue to make Sikhs the butt of our jokes? Must Indian-British relationship still hang by the thread of such inane terms like 'paki'? Would any sports commentator be stupid enough to expose his designs on television as Bakshi’s Tahil does? This is where  Chak De India scores with its neat script and no-nonsense approach with none of the romance, dances and usual Bollywood numbers of Dhan Dhana Dhan Goal.” Khalid Mohamed of Hindustan Times wrote ″To be fair, the last 15 minutes or so do whip up sufficient nationalist fervour. The finale championship game is rigorously conceived and executed, and ably lensed by Attar Singh Saini. For the rest of the way, the helter-skelter direction, the shallow characterisations, the ear-piercing background music score and the slack editing, make you wish you had stayed at home. Honestly, this one’s too much like that famous song Goalie maar bheje mein.″

See also
List of sports films

References

External links 
 

2007 films
Indian sports drama films
Indian association football films
2000s Hindi-language films
Films about racism
Films featuring songs by Pritam
UTV Motion Pictures films
Films scored by Sanjoy Chowdhury
2000s sports drama films
Films directed by Vivek Agnihotri
2007 drama films
Films shot in Greater Manchester